Calamitaceae is an extinct family of plants related to the modern horsetails.  Some members of this family attained tree-like stature during the Carboniferous Period (around ) and in Permian Period, reaching heights of up to 20 meters.  The family takes its name from its principal genus Calamites.

Because some proposed species are based on partial fossil records, it is not clear if these are merely different parts of the same type.

Proposed genera and species of Calamitaceae 

 Annularia.
 A. stellata.
 Arthropitys.
 Asterophyllites (or incorrectly Asterophyllum).
 Astromyelon.

 Calamites.
 C. carinatus.
 C. suckowi.
 C. undulatus.
 Calamocarpon.
 Calamostachys.
 C. binneyana.
 Cingularia.
 Mazostachys.
 Paleostachya.

References

External links 
  Link to information and pictures

Equisetales
Carboniferous plants
Prehistoric plant families
Fern families
Carboniferous first appearances
Carboniferous extinctions